Agimsaly Duzelkhanov (Aǵymsaly Duzelhanuly Duzelhanov; born August 19, 1951) is a Kazakhstani artist.

Born in Kazalinsk in Kyzyl-Orda oblast, he graduated from Almaty Art College and Moscow State Institute. He is the winner of international and national exhibitions and contests, and his artwork is on display in presidential palaces of the President of Kazakhstan in Almaty, Astana and in Ashgabat, Turkmenistan. He is also a noted graphic designer and illustrator of books in Kazakhstan and in 1992 was responsible for designing some of the currency bills after independence.

References

Kazakhstani painters
Kazakhstani illustrators
1951 births
Living people
20th-century Kazakhstani painters
21st-century Kazakhstani painters